Florian Marange (born 3 March 1986) is a French former professional footballer, who played as a left-back. His former clubs include Girondins de Bordeaux and Crystal Palace.

Career
Marange began his career in 2002 with Girondins de Bordeaux and was promoted to the first team in 2004. He gave on 20 November 2005 his first games against Paris Saint-Germain.

He was loaned out to Le Havre AC from FC Girondins de Bordeaux on 8 January 2009 and returned on 1 July 2009.

On 16 August 2013, Marange signed a one-year deal with English side Crystal Palace, on a Bosman transfer. He made his debut on 27 August, in a 2–1 defeat against Bristol City in the second round of the League Cup. However, he was left out of Palace's 25-man Premier League squad and was described as 'slow' by manager Ian Holloway. He made only a few further appearances in friendly and reserve games for Palace before his contract was paid up in October.

In January 2014, Marange signed for Ligue 1 side FC Sochaux-Montbéliard.

Six months later, he signed a two-year contract with SC Bastia.

Honours
Bordeaux
Coupe de la Ligue: 2006–07
Coupe de France: 2012–13

References

External links
 
 

1986 births
Living people
People from Talence
Sportspeople from Gironde
French footballers
French expatriate footballers
France youth international footballers
France under-21 international footballers
Association football defenders
FC Girondins de Bordeaux players
Le Havre AC players
AS Nancy Lorraine players
Crystal Palace F.C. players
FC Sochaux-Montbéliard players
SC Bastia players
Ligue 1 players
Expatriate footballers in England
Footballers from Nouvelle-Aquitaine